The South African cricket team toured India during the 1996–97 cricket season, playing three Test matches and one One Day International (ODI). The tour was South Africa's second international cricket series in India, following a visit in 1991–92,  and included their first Test appearances against India on the subcontinent. India had previously toured South Africa in 1992–93, losing the Test series 0–1.

The tour began with the Titan Cup, a triangular ODI tournament which included Australia on 17 October 1996. South Africa won all its round-robin matches—three each against India and Australia—but lost to India in the final. India's Sachin Tendulkar was the leading run-scorer in the tournament with 320 runs. South Africa's Allan Donald was the highest wicket-taker with 17 wickets and received the player of the series award.

India won the Test series, winning the first and third match. Several players, including Herschelle Gibbs, Lance Klusener and VVS Laxman, made their Test debuts. Laxman scored a fifty in the second innings of the first Test and Klusener picked up eight wickets for 64 runs in the second innings of the second Test at Kolkata. The figures remain the fourth best by any bowler on debut. Mohammad Azharuddin was named the Man of the Test series after scoring 388 runs at an average of 77.60; Javagal Srinath was the most successful bowler collecting 17 wickets at an average of 20.94.

At the end of the tour, South Africa played India in a benefit match for Mohinder Amarnath at the Wankhede Stadium in Mumbai. India won the ODI by 74 runs; Tendulkar went on to score 114 and was selected the man of the match.

Tour matches

Three-day: Karnataka v South Africans

Three-day: Indian Board President's XI v South Africa

Three-day: India A v South Africans

Test series

First Test

Second Test

Third Test

One Day International Match

Only ODI

References

External links
 South Africa tour of India 1996/97 at ESPNcricinfo
 Tour home at ESPNcricinfo archive
 Tour home at test-cricket-tours.co.uk
 

1996 in Indian cricket
1996 in South African cricket
Indian cricket seasons from 1970–71 to 1999–2000
International cricket competitions from 1994–95 to 1997
1996-97